Wondge Bruny (born August 29, 1978), best known by his stage name Won-G, is a Haitian-American rapper.

Career
Won-G was born in Port-au-Prince, Haiti, and raised in Brooklyn, New York. He has released several records, including: Shadow of the Rains (1994), Do It, Do It (1995), Royal Impression (2000), No Better Than This (2001), Explosion (2002), Rage of the Age (2004), and Haiti Prince (2008).  Won-G has released singles "Rich Together feat Rick Ross" (2015), "Racks" (2015), and "I Can’t Sleep at Night" (2014).

His 2001 single "Nothing Wrong" reached No. 26 on the Billboard Hot 100 Singles Sales chart. "Put It Inside", featuring Da Brat, reached #15 on the Hot Rap Singles chart.

Discography

Albums

Singles

References

External links
 

1980 births
Living people
People from Port-au-Prince
American rappers of Haitian descent
Haitian rappers
Haitian businesspeople
Haitian emigrants to the United States
21st-century American rappers